Atenas is a district of the Atenas canton, in the Alajuela province of Costa Rica. Its urban area is referred as Atenas city.

Toponymy
Its name means Athens (Αθήνα), the capital of Greece.

Geography 
Atenas has an area of  km² and an elevation of  metres. It is located on the western edge of the Central Valley (Valle Central), 25 kilometers southwest of the provincial capital city of Alajuela, 20 kilometers from Juan Santamaria International Airport, and 35 kilometers from the national capital city of San Jose.

It has a varied sets of altitudes starting at 300 meters above sea level in the Balsa and Rio Grande areas ascending to up to 1,200 meters above sea level in the San Isidro area. This wide spectrum of heights provides to marked and well defined climatic subregions within the greater Atenas area.

The town is surrounded by mountains and coffee plantations. It is located in a prosperous agricultural area which hosts a weekly farmer's market on Thursday afternoons and Friday mornings. The town center features a church and a park lined with palm trees. There is a community health center, pharmacies, doctors, dentists, tennis court, fitness center, swimming pools, parks, banks, shops, bed-and-breakfasts, and restaurants in the village.

Atenas is a popular place for North American and European retirees.

There are four major real estate developments with existing homes and building lots: Roca Verde, Vista Atenas, Lomas Al Paraiso and Hacienda Atenas. There are other real estate developments in various stages of completion.

In mid-October 2011, a major landslide occurred on the Atenas exit of Autopista del Sol. The exit has since re-opened improving travel time to San José, Escazú and Pacific beaches.

Climate 

It is popularly said that Atenas enjoys the 'best climate in the world'; the reason for this attribution is that climatic factors like temperature and humidity are stable all year round, with temperatures ranging from 19 Celsius at night to 34 Celsius during the day with a yearly average of 26 Celsius.

Demographics 

For the 2011 census, Atenas had a population of  inhabitants.

Transportation

Road transportation 
The district is covered by the following road routes:
 National Route 3
 National Route 134
 National Route 135
 National Route 707

References 

Districts of Alajuela Province
Populated places in Alajuela Province